The Sphinx is the name of two fictional characters appearing in American comic books published by Marvel Comics.

Publication history
The first version of the Sphinx first appeared in Nova #6 (Feb. 1977) and was created by Marv Wolfman and Sal Buscema.

The second version of the Sphinx first appeared in The New Warriors #4 (Aug. 1990) and was created by Fabian Nicieza.

Fictional character biography

Anath-Na Mut

Anath-Na Mut is a chief wizard in the court of the Egyptian Pharaoh Ramesses II. Defeated in a magic duel by the prophet Moses, the magician got exiled into the desert for his failure. The title Nova recounts in a flashback of how Anath-Na discovers the mystic Ka Stone, which grants him immortality and superhuman powers. Using the alias of the Sphinx, Anath-Na wanders around the Earth for a thousand years and then, eventually becomes bored with it. After learning about the origins of Richard Rider, aliens from planet Xandar, and their sentient machine, the Sphinx theorized that Xandar's Living Computer just might be a way to end his eternal life.

In a Fantastic Four Annual, the Sphinx empowered a pawn known as Thraxon to help subdue the Inhumans. He utilizes ruler Black Bolt's electron energy to amplify a scanning device and read all the minds in everyone for knowledge of how the Sphinx could finally die. Superhero team the Fantastic Four defeated Thraxon and in a final confrontation, Black Bolt blasts him into deep space. The Sphinx reappears in the Nova series, taking mental control of Nova, along with his temporary allies (Comet, Crimebuster, Diamondhead, Powerhouse, and Doctor Sun), they travel back to Xandar and join a war against the invading Skrulls.

The story continues in the Fantastic Four series, where this proves to be a ruse as, once on Xandar, the Sphinx took advantage of that war so he can find and absorb more knowledge from its planet-size computer. Evolving into a god, the Sphinx decided to destroy the Earth. The Fantastic Four witness this and, knowing that they are outmatched, Mister Fantastic contacts the cosmic entity Galactus and presents a proposal — if he stops the Sphinx, then Mister Fantastic will release him from his vow to never devour Earth. He accepts and, when the group found Galactus a new herald (Terrax the Tamer), they traveled to Earth again. After Galactus defeated the Sphinx, he crushed the Ka Stone and send him back in human form to ancient Egypt, where Anath-Na belongs. As Anath-Na, he is trapped in a time loop, forcing him to constantly relive his life to this point.

An issue of the title Marvel Two-in-One continues the story, as Anath-Na relives his life several times due to a chronal flaw, until he meets himself, the younger Anath-Na. He warns himself about his fate in the future. Then, the two build a machine to reconstruct the Ka Stone and after hypnotizing the past version of Anath-Na so that he would not remember, the future version enters suspended animation. The future Sphinx awakens after Galactus departs and begins to rebuild the Ka Stone. The heroic Thing, however, battles him into a standstill, destroys his machine, and leaving the Sphinx with an incomplete Ka Stone. But the Sphinx learns that the unfinished stone is losing all of its energies and seeks revenge on the Thing. The villainous Puppet Master assists him by forcing the Sphinx to crush his own Ka Stone; as a result Anath-Na immediately ages 5,000 years before turning into dust.

As part of the All-New, All-Different Marvel event, the Sphinx obtained Nadeen Hassan's brother Navid as an apprentice where he helped him retrieve numerous Egyptian artifacts from the San Francisco Museum of Egyptian Culture.

Meryet Karim
Meryet Karim is a desert nomad who finds an unconscious Anath-Na Mut soon after he found the Ka Stone. While nursing him back to health, Karim absorbed residual energies from the Ka Stone, which granted her a fraction of its powers. Karim discovers that every time she was being perpetually reincarnated into new bodies and retains the knowledge of her previous life with each death. In the modern era, she finds the Ka Scepter's remnants and reconstructs it to become the new Sphinx. Then, Karim alters history so Anath-Na will kill Moses, which leads to Egypt eventually conquering the world during the Forever Yesterday storyline. She was thwarted by the superhero team the New Warriors and resurrected Anath-Na in a bid to reclaim his love. The empowered Sphinx battles the New Warriors, but when facing his feelings for Karim, he merges with her into one composite entity who goes back in time to live a normal life.

The gestalt entity has a final appearance in the title The New Warriors before reappearing as the male Sphinx in the third volume of the title Nova. The character discovers that Galactus' curse is still in effect and battles Nova once again, intent on having access to Xandarian knowledge. The Sphinx appears in an issue of the fourth volume of the title Nova.

Powers and abilities
The Sphinx is an ancient mutant, who gained additional powers through use of the Ka Stone and possibly other sources. He possesses supernatural strength, stamina, and durability, as well as virtual immortality. Courtesy to the jewel's mystical properties, Anath-Na also possesses a range of metaphysical abilities, including energy control, mind reading, hypersonic flight, and knowledge absorption. After imbuing herself with energies from the Ka Scepter, Karim has nigh-omnipotence. Both Sphinxes have expertise in Egyptian magic.

References

Characters created by Marv Wolfman
Characters created by Sal Buscema
Comics characters introduced in 1977
Fictional ancient Egyptians
Fictional characters who can manipulate reality
Fictional characters with absorption or parasitic abilities
Fictional characters with energy-manipulation abilities
Fictional characters with immortality
Fictional characters with superhuman durability or invulnerability
Fictional telepaths
Fictional wizards
Marvel Comics characters who use magic
Marvel Comics characters with superhuman strength
Marvel Comics mutants
Marvel Comics supervillains